Stuart Petre Brodie Mais (4 July 1885 – 21 April 1975), known publicly as S. P. B. Mais, was a British author, journalist and broadcaster. He was an author of travel books and guides, and had an informal style that made him popular with the general public.

Biography
Petre Mais, as he was known in his personal life, was the son of Rev. John Brodie Stuart Mais, curate of St Margaret's, Ladywood, Birmingham and his wife Hannah Horden (née Tamlin). He was born at Ladywood, but raised in Tansley, Derbyshire, where his family relocated on his father's appointment as rector there in 1890.

He was educated at Denstone College, Staffordshire, then read English Literature at Christ Church, Oxford (BA 1909, MA 1913)  After teaching at Rossall, Sherborne and Tonbridge, and Royal Air Force College Cranwell, he later worked for National Press at Fleet Street. A prolific author of over 200 books, he also broadcast for numerous wireless programmes for the BBC between the 1920s and 1940s. Mais was an ardent campaigner for the English countryside and traditions, leading walks for people who came for a day trip by train from big cities, often from London.

Mais worked as a journalist for The Oxford Times newspaper, and also for the BBC as a radio broadcaster, most famously on the Kitchen Front radio show that aired after the morning news during World War Two. He presented Letter from America from 1933, 13 years before a similar concept was made famous by Alistair Cooke. He also presented a series on This Unknown Island.

One grandson is Evening Standard writer Sebastian Shakespeare, who wrote of his grandfather:

Personal life
In 1913, Mais married Doris Snow; they had two daughters: Priscilla (1916–1982) and Vivien (born 1920). After their separation (they never divorced), he had a relationship with Winifred Doughty (1905–1993), who changed her name by deed poll to Gillian ("Jill") Mais; they also had two daughters. After becoming dissatisfied with living standards in the tiny retirement home at Lindfield, Sussex that had been offered to the penniless Mais by the Samaritan Housing Association, along with Mais's refusal to marry her, Jill left Mais for a mutual friend, Dudley Carew, whom she married, and lived with him across the road from Mais, taking him meals.

Death
Mais died on 21 April 1975 at his retirement accommodation Lindfield, Sussex.

Bibliography

Critical works
 Delight in Books (1931)
 A Chronicle of English Literature (1936)

Novels
 The Education of a Philanderer (1919)
 Prunello (1924)
 Eclipse (1925)
 Perissa (1925)
 Orange Street (1926)
 Light over Lundy (1938)

Travel books
These include:
 See England First (1927)
 Do you know North Cornwall? My finest holiday (1927 for the Southern Railway)
 The Cornish Riviera (1928 for the Great Western Railway)
 Glorious Devon (1928 for the Great Western Railway)
 North Wales (1928 for the London Midland and Scottish Railway)
 Sussex 1929
 It isn't far from London (1930)
 Southern rambles for Londoners (1931 for the Southern Railway)
 The Highlands of Britain (1932)
 This unknown island (1932)
 Week-ends in England (1933)
 Isles of the island (1934)
 England's pleasance (1935)
 Lovely Britain edited (1935)
 Round about England (1935)
 Southern schools (1935 for the Southern Railway)
 Pictorial Britain and Ireland (ca1936 for the Anglo-American Oil Co – Esso)
 England's Character (1936)
 A.C.E: the Atlantic Coast Express (1937 for the Southern Railway)
 Britain calling (1938)
 Let's get out here (1938 for the Southern Railway)
 Walking in Somerset (1938)
 Highways and Byways in the Welsh Marches (1939)
 Hills of the South (1939)
 I Return to Scotland (1947)
 I Return to Switzerland (1948)
 I Return to Ireland (1948)
 I Return to Wales (1949)
 Little England Beyond Wales (1949)
 The Land of The Cinque Ports (illus. by Rowland Hilder) (1949)
 The Riviera – New Look and Old (1950)
 We Wander in the West (1950)
 Arden and Avon (1951)
 Norwegian Odyssey (1951)
 The Channel Islands (1953)
 Our Village Today (1956)
 Majorcan Holiday (with Gillian Mais) (1956)

Further reading
  (autobiography) 
  (autobiography) 
 
    There are many references to Mais in this book about his daughter, the author's aunt.

References

External links
 Eugene Suggett: An 80th anniversary
 
 

1885 births
1975 deaths
20th-century English non-fiction writers
English travel writers
English broadcasters
People from Derbyshire Dales (district)
English male non-fiction writers
People from Ladywood
20th-century English male writers
People from Lindfield, West Sussex